MainPower New Zealand Limited is an electricity distribution company, based in Rangiora, New Zealand, responsible for electricity distribution to nearly 42,000 customers in the Canterbury region north of the Waimakariri River. MainPower was formed in 1993, after the Energy Companies Act 1992 required the North Canterbury Electric Power Board to reform into a commercial power company. More reforms in 1998 required electricity companies nationally to split their lines and retail businesses, with MainPower retaining its lines business and selling its retail business to Contact Energy.

MainPower has initiated a number of local generation projects, including the Mount Cass Wind Farm (proposed) and Cleardale Hydro Power Station (operating).

Electricity network
The area includes the towns of Kaiapoi, Rangiora, Oxford, Woodend, Pegasus, Amberley, Waipara, Culverden, Cheviot, Hanmer Springs and Kaikoura.

MainPower takes electricity from Transpower's national grid at five grid exit points (GXPs): Kaiapoi, Southbrook, Ashley, Waipara and Culverden.  It operates 4,873 km of circuits at 66,000 and 33,000 volts for subtransmission, and 22,000 and 11,000 volts for distribution. As is standard in New Zealand, electricity is delivered to homes at 230/400 volts (phase-to-neutral/phase-to-phase).

In 2011, MainPower purchased the Kaikoura GXP and Culverden to Kaikoura 66 kV transmission line from Transpower. In 2015, MainPower completed works to up-rate the network west of Rangiora towards Oxford to 66/22 kV (from 33/11 kV). Other projects in progress include upgrading the 33 kV subtransmission line between Cheviot and Kaikoura to 66 kV, and preparing for a new "Rangora East" GXP between Rangiora and Woodend to supply Woodend and Pegasus, offloading Kaiapoi GXP.

In the year to 31 March 2021, the MainPower network had a SAIDI of 297.35 minutes, meaning the average customer experiences 4 hours 57 minutes hours without electricity every year.

See also
 Electricity sector in New Zealand

References

External links
 
  

Electric power distribution network operators in New Zealand
Rangiora